The Battle of Cassel, was an action by the French to secure their flanks during the English siege of Calais in 1347.

Citations

References
 

1347 in France
Conflicts in 1347
Battles of the Hundred Years' War